Oni is a small village in Ratnagiri district, Maharashtra state in Western India. The 2011 Census of India recorded a total of 1,118  residents in the village. Oni is 30 hectares in size.

References

Villages in Ratnagiri district